was the 120th Emperor of Japan, according to the traditional order of succession.  Ninkō's reign spanned the years from 1817 until his death in 1846, and saw further deterioration of the power of the ruling Shōgun.  Disasters, which included famine, combined with corruption and increasing Western interference, helped to erode public trust in the bakufu government.  Emperor Ninkō attempted to revive certain court rituals and practices upon the wishes of his father.  However, it is unknown what role, if any, the Emperor had in the turmoil which occurred during his reign.  His family included fifteen children from various concubines, but only three of them lived to adulthood.  His fourth son, Imperial Prince Osahito became the next Emperor upon Ninkō's death in 1846.  While political power at the time still resided with the Shōgun, the beginnings of the Bakumatsu (end of military government) were at hand.

Events of Ninkō's life

Early life
He was born on 16 March 1800 and was the fourth son of Emperor Kōkaku. He was the only child of sixteen others to survive into adulthood. His birth mother was one of his father's concubines named .

Reign

Prince Ayahito was enthroned as Emperor on 31 October 1817, after his father retired from the throne. Following his father the Retired Emperor's wishes, he attempted to revive certain court rituals and practices. These included, among other things, restoring the title tennō, which identified the Emperor. Among Ninkō's innovations was the establishment of the Gakushūsho (the predecessor of the Gakushūin) for the Court Nobility just outside the Imperial Palace. One major event during his reign was the Tenpō famine which lasted from 1833 to 1837. The famine was most severe in northern Honshū and was caused by flooding and cold weather. Ninkō's reign also saw some deterioration of the Shōgun's power. The Tenpō famine and other concurring natural disasters hit hard, and shook the faith of the people in the ruling Shōgun. In 1837, Ōshio Heihachirō led a revolt in Osaka against corrupt officials who refused to help feed the impoverished residents of the city. That same year also had an incident take place where an American merchant vessel was driven away by coastal artillery. While order was eventually restored, long term resentment resonated with the commoners against the ruling government. It is unclear though what role, if any, the Emperor played during this period of unrest.

Emperor Ninkō died on 21 February 1846 and was enshrined in the Imperial mausoleum, which is at Sennyū-ji in Higashiyama-ku, Kyoto. Also enshrined in Tsuki no wa no misasagi, at Sennyū-ji are this Emperor's immediate Imperial predecessors since Emperor Go-Mizunoo – Meishō, Go-Kōmyō, Go-Sai, Reigen, Higashiyama, Nakamikado, Sakuramachi, Momozono, Go-Sakuramachi, Go-Momozono and Kōkaku. The shrine complex also encompasses the misasagi of Ninkō's immediate successor – Kōmei. Empress Dowager Yoshikō is also entombed at this Imperial mausoleum complex.

Eras and Kugyō
The years of Ninkō's reign are more specifically identified by more than one era name or nengō. While  is a collective term for the very few most powerful men attached to the court of the Emperor of Japan in pre-Meiji eras. Even during those years in which the court's actual influence outside the palace walls was minimal, the hierarchic organization persisted.

The following eras occurred during Ninkō's reign: 

 Bunka (1804–1818)
 Bunsei (1818–1830)
 Tenpō (1830–1844)
 Kōka (1844–1848)

During Ninkō's reign, this apex of the Daijō-kan included: 

 Kampaku, Ichijō Tadayoshi, 1814–1823
 Kampaku, Takatsukasa Masamichi, 1823–1856
 Sadaijin Udaijin Naidaijin DainagonGenealogy

Emperor Ninkō's family included 7 sons and 8 daughters from various concubines, but only the future Emperor Komei (Komei-tennō), Princess Sumiko (Sumiko-naishinnō) and Princess Chikako (Chikako-naishinnō) survived beyond childhood.

Spouse

Concubines

Issue

Ancestry

Notes

See also
 Emperor of Japan
 List of Emperors of Japan
 Imperial cult
 Modern system of ranked Shinto Shrines

References
 Meyer, Eva-Maria. (1999).  Japans Kaiserhof in der Edo-Zeit: unter besonderer Berücksichtigung der Jahre 1846 bis 1867.  Münster: LIT Verlag. 	;   OCLC 42041594
 Ponsonby-Fane, Richard Arthur Brabazon. (1959).  The Imperial House of Japan. Kyoto: Ponsonby Memorial Society. OCLC 194887
 Titsingh, Isaac. (1834). Nihon Ōdai Ichiran''; ou,  Annales des empereurs du Japon.  Paris: Royal Asiatic Society, Oriental Translation Fund of Great Britain and Ireland.  OCLC 5850691
 Varley, H. Paul. (1980). Jinnō Shōtōki: A Chronicle of Gods and Sovereigns. New York: Columbia University Press. ;  OCLC 59145842

External links
Kazu-No-Miya Chikako

Japanese emperors
1800 births
1846 deaths
Emperor Ninko
Emperor Ninko
Emperor Ninko
Emperor Ninko
Emperor Ninko
18th-century Japanese people
19th-century Japanese monarchs
Sons of emperors